Chudovo (also Chudovo Northwest) is an air base in Leningrad Oblast, Russia located 12 km south of Lyuban. It appears to be a bare-bones forward deployment base and is cut tightly into forest. It is currently used as a parachute school.

References

Russian Air Force bases
Soviet Air Force bases
Buildings and structures in Leningrad Oblast